City of Thieves is a single-player adventure gamebook written by Ian Livingstone and illustrated by Iain McCaig. Originally published by Puffin Books in 1983, the title is the fifth gamebook in the Fighting Fantasy series. It was later republished by Wizard Books in 2002.

Plot 
City of Thieves is a fantasy scenario in which the hero is retained by the village of Silverton to save them from Zanbar Bone, lord of the undead; to do this, the hero must first travel to Port Blacksand to enlist the aid of the magician Nicodemus.

The player takes the role of an adventurer on a quest to find and stop the powerful Night Prince Zanbar Bone, a being whose minions are terrorizing a local town. Hired by a desperate mayor, the player must as the adventurer journey to the dangerous city-state of Port Blacksand (the titular "City of Thieves"), and find the wizard Nicodemus, who apparently knows of Bone's one weakness. What follows is a series of challenges as the player must locate certain key items, escape Port Blacksand and eventually confront Bone.

Reception
Marcus L. Rowland reviewed City of Thieves for the January 1984 issue of White Dwarf, rating the title 8 out of a possible 10. According to Rowland, "Most encounters in the city are potentially lethal, several being no-win situations where the best outcome involves injury or loss of money."

Reviews
Review by Don D'Ammassa (1984) in Science Fiction Chronicle, #61 October 1984

References

City of Thieves
Books by Ian Livingstone
City of Thieves